Miditerranean Pads is the twenty-first album by Klaus Schulze. It was originally released in 1990, and in 2005 was the twelfth Schulze album reissued by Revisited Records. This is the first of two reissues not to feature a bonus track (the other being Dosburg Online), though the first track is extended by two minutes.

Track listing
All tracks composed by Klaus Schulze.

References

External links
 Miditerranean Pads at the official site of Klaus Schulze
 

Klaus Schulze albums
1990 albums